Sandra Caldwell may refer to:
 Sandra Caldwell (civil servant) (born 1948), British civil servant
 Sandra Caldwell (actress), American actress